The Jalesveva Jayamahe Monument (Indonesian: Monumen Jalesveva Jayamahe, abbreviated Monjaya) is a monument located in Semampir, Surabaya, East Java, Indonesia near the Port of Tanjung Perak. It is a statue of an Indonesian Navy officer wearing Ceremonial Service Dress, complete with his sword of honor. The officer depicted staring into the ocean, looking as if he is challenging the tides. It is meant to represent the preparedness of the Indonesian Navy for any scenario. The statue stands at a height of 60.6 meters (199ft), about the same as the adjacent building. The Jalesveva Jayamahe Monument represents the nation's future generation's optimism towards the accomplishment of the Indonesian dream.

The monument's name is taken from the Indonesian Navy's motto in Sanskrit Jalesveva Jayamahe which means Our Glory is at the Seas. The construction was started in 1993 by the Indonesian Chief of Navy, later continued by Indonesian National Force Admiral Muhammad Arifin and designed by I Nyoman Nuarta. Other than a monument, this building also functions as a lighthouse for ships on the surrounding sea.

References

Buildings and structures in Surabaya
Tourist attractions in East Java
Monumental columns in Indonesia
Monuments and memorials in Indonesia